John Christopher Lowe (born 25 January 1949 in Ayrshire, Scotland) is a Scottish-born former news presenter who worked for BBC News for 37 years until his retirement on 4 January 2009.

Education
Lowe was educated at Dragon School in Oxford, Haileybury College, and at Brasenose College, Oxford.

Career
After graduation in 1972, Lowe intended to train as a teacher. He joined the BBC in 1972 on the same day as Jeremy Paxman under the graduate journalist programme. He worked as a political correspondent at Westminster and then spent time as a journalist in Northern Ireland during the worst of what became known as The Troubles. Later his work for the BBC took him as far afield as Ethiopia and Argentina.

From the mid-1990s he was a newsreader on BBC One bulletins, also becoming a frequent presenter on radio programmes such as PM.  His final work for the BBC until his retirement in 2009 saw him presenting on the BBC News Channel on Fridays between 7pm and 10pm, and Saturdays and Sundays between 7pm and 12 midnight. His co-presenters included Anita McVeigh and Joanna Gosling. Lowe was replaced in April 2009 by Clive Myrie.

Personal life
Chris Lowe lives in Ealing, West London. His son Alex is a sports reporter for The Times newspaper and his daughter Rebecca works as a sports presenter,  for NBC Sports in the US.

A lifelong Crystal Palace supporter, Lowe was an elected member of the Executive Board of Middlesex County Cricket Club (2010–2019), and is a former chairman of its Dining Club. He also chairs regular forums for The Cricket Society for whom he was appointed as a vice-president in 2006, a position he shares with Derek Underwood and  Tim Rice .

References

1949 births
Living people
People educated at The Dragon School
People educated at Haileybury and Imperial Service College
Alumni of Brasenose College, Oxford
BBC newsreaders and journalists